José Parra is the name of:
 José Parra (baseball) (born 1972), baseball player from the Dominican Republic
 José Parra (footballer) (1925–2016), Spanish footballer
 José Felipe Parra (1780–1846), Spanish painter
 José Mauricio Parra (born 1990), Venezuelan footballer
 José Miguel Parra (1780–1846), Spanish painter